The 1986 Men's Asian Games Basketball Tournament was held in South Korea from September 22, 1986 to October 3, 1986.

Results

Final standing

References
Results

External links
Basketball Results

Men